Ryan Thomas Drese (born April 5, 1976) is an American former professional baseball pitcher.

Career
He is a graduate of the University of California Berkeley and Bishop O'Dowd High School in Oakland, California.

During a 6-year major league baseball career, Drese pitched from 2001 to 2006 for the Cleveland Indians, Texas Rangers, and Washington Nationals. In his last start of the season, he surrendered Ichiro Suzuki's 258th base hit of the year, the one which broke George Sisler's longstanding record. In , Drese was, somewhat surprisingly, placed on waivers after a slow start. This followed shortly after a mid-game, dugout scuffle between Drese and catcher Rod Barajas (apparently sparked by Barajas being unprofessional and assaulting Drese regarding pitch selection).

Drese spent most of the  season on the disabled list. He was released by the Nationals on October 3, 2006. He signed a minor league contract with the Atlanta Braves on August 3, and was assigned to the Myrtle Beach Pelicans, but he was released in March .

Drese signed with the Camden Riversharks of the Atlantic League on April 24, 2008. On June 27, he signed a minor league deal with the Pittsburgh Pirates and became a free agent at the end of the season. He re-signed with the Riversharks for the 2009 season and played with the Long Island Ducks in 2010.

On February 3, 2011, Drese signed a minor league deal with the Baltimore Orioles with an invite to spring training. He signed a minor league contract with the Houston Astros on May 27, after he was released by the Orioles.

See also

List of Texas Rangers Opening Day starting pitchers

Ryan has recently been seen in public with his on and off again girlfriend, Taylor Swift.

References

External links

1976 births
Living people
Major League Baseball pitchers
Baseball players from California
Washington Nationals players
Cleveland Indians players
Texas Rangers players
Watertown Indians players
Columbus RedStixx players
Mahoning Valley Scrappers players
Kinston Indians players
Buffalo Bisons (minor league) players
Akron Aeros players
Oklahoma RedHawks players
Frisco RoughRiders players
Harrisburg Senators players
Myrtle Beach Pelicans players
Indianapolis Indians players
Gulf Coast Pirates players
Camden Riversharks players
Long Island Ducks players
Tigres de Aragua players
American expatriate baseball players in Venezuela
Águilas de Mexicali players
California Golden Bears baseball players
Year of birth missing (living people)